Wan Hassan bin Mohd Ramli (Jawi  وان حسن محمد رملي; is a Malaysian politician. He chairs the National Water Service Commission (SPAN).

Education background 
• Jerangau Sungai Primary School, 1963

• Dungun Men's Primary School

• Dungun English Secondary School (now Sultan Omar Secondary School)

Election results

References

Living people
1957 births
People from Kelantan
Malaysian people of Malay descent
Members of the Dewan Rakyat
Members of the Terengganu State Legislative Assembly
Terengganu state executive councillors
21st-century Malaysian politicians